Charles Stone, D.D. was an 18th-century Anglican priest in Ireland.

Stone educated at Trinity College, Dublin. He was Archdeacon of Meath from 1759 until his death in March 1799

References

1799 deaths
Alumni of Trinity College Dublin
18th-century Irish Anglican priests
Archdeacons of Meath